Cytoskeleton-associated protein 2 is a protein that in humans is encoded by the CKAP2 gene.

Human CKAP2 gene, the cDNA of which is known as LB1, is a cytoskeleton-associated protein involved in mitotic progression. Its high transcriptional activity has been observed in the testes, thymus, and diffuse B-cell lymphomas. The gene codes for a protein of 683 residues, which lacks a homology to known amino acid sequences. On evidence of immunofluorescence analysis, the CKAP2 product is a cytoplasmic protein associated with cytoskeletal fibrils.
The CKAP2 gene is in chromosome 13q14. Rearrangements of this region result in various tumors. Thus deletions have been detected in multiple myeloma, prostate cancer, head-and-neck squamous-cell carcinoma, B-cell prolymphocytic leukemia, non-Hodgkin lymphoma, and in more than half cases of B-cell chronic lymphocytic leukemia.

References

Alternative titles: tumor- and microtubule-associated protein; TMAP, LB1

External links

Further reading